Jalmari Haapanen (18 November 1882, Kivijärvi - 24 February 1961) was a Finnish farmer and politician. He was a member of the Parliament of Finland from 1916 to 1917, representing the Agrarian League.

References

1882 births
1961 deaths
People from Kivijärvi
People from Vaasa Province (Grand Duchy of Finland)
Centre Party (Finland) politicians
Members of the Parliament of Finland (1916–17)